Joseph Reid Kyle (16 October 1913 – November 1962) was a Scottish amateur footballer who played as an inside forward in the Scottish League for Queen's Park. He represented Great Britain at the 1936 Summer Olympics and was capped by Scotland at amateur level.

References

1913 births
1962 deaths
Scottish footballers
Queen's Park F.C. players
Footballers at the 1936 Summer Olympics
Olympic footballers of Great Britain
Scotland amateur international footballers
People from Barrhead
Association football inside forwards
Sportspeople from East Renfrewshire